Tollywood films of the 1970s may refer to:

 Bengali films of the 1970s
 Telugu films of the 1970s